The 1952 United States presidential election in Kentucky took place on November 4, 1952, as part of the 1952 United States presidential election. Kentucky voters chose 10 representatives, or electors, to the Electoral College, who voted for president and vice president.

Kentucky was won by Adlai Stevenson (D–Illinois), running with Senator John Sparkman, with 49.91 percent of the popular vote, against Columbia University President Dwight D. Eisenhower (R–New York), running with Senator Richard Nixon, with 49.84 percent of the popular vote. The race in Kentucky was the closest in the nation, with the candidates separated by a mere 700 votes, or 0.07 percent of the vote, and in fact was the closest presidential election in any state since New Hampshire was won by Woodrow Wilson by fifty-six votes in 1916.

As of 2020, this remains the only presidential election since 1924 in which Kentucky voted for a different candidate than neighboring Tennessee, as well as the last time until 2008 that the state voted differently than neighboring Ohio. This was also the last time the Republicans won the presidency without carrying Kentucky, as well as the last time that a non-Southern Democrat would carry the state.

Results

Results by county

References

Kentucky
1952
1952 Kentucky elections